Chicago strike or Chicago strikes may refer to:

 The 1905 Chicago teamsters' strike
 The 1910 Chicago garment workers' strike
 The Burlington railroad strike of 1888, against the Chicago, Burlington and Quincy Railroad
 The Chicago Newspaper strike of 1912
 The Chicago railroad strike of 1877
 The 1894 Pullman Strike, which took place in the Chicago neighborhood of Pullman
The 1886 Haymarket affair was a May day demonstration in Chicago

See also
 List of incidents of civil unrest in Chicago
 List of strikes